A closed-end fund (CEF) is a fund that raises capital by issuing a fixed number of shares which are not redeemable, and then invest that capital in financial assets such as stocks and bonds. Unlike open-end funds, new shares in a closed-end fund are not created by managers to meet demand from investors. Instead, the shares can be purchased and sold only in the market, which is the original design of the mutual fund, which predates open-end mutual funds but offers the same actively-managed pooled investments.

In the United States, closed-end funds sold publicly must be registered under both the Securities Act of 1933 and the Investment Company Act of 1940.

Closed-end funds are usually listed on a recognized stock exchange and can be bought and sold on that exchange. The price per share is determined by the market and is usually different from the underlying value or net asset value (NAV) per share of the investments held by the fund. The price is said to be at a discount or premium to the NAV when it is below or above the NAV, respectively.

A premium might be caused by the market's confidence in the investment managers' ability or the underlying securities to produce above-market returns. A discount might reflect the charges to be deducted from the fund in future by the managers, uncertainty from high amounts of leverage, concerns related to liquidity or lack of investor confidence in the underlying securities.

In the United States, closed-end funds are referred to under the law as closed-end companies and form one of three SEC-recognized types of investment companies along with mutual funds and unit investment trusts.

Availability
Closed-end funds are typically traded on the major global stock exchanges. In the United States the New York Stock Exchange is dominant although the NASDAQ is in competition; in the United Kingdom the London Stock Exchange's main market is home to the mainstream funds although AIM supports many small funds especially the venture capital trusts; in Canada, the Toronto Stock Exchange lists many closed-end funds.

Like their better-known open-ended cousins, closed-end funds are usually sponsored by a fund management company which will control how the fund is invested. They begin by soliciting money from investors in an initial offering, which may be public or limited. The investors are given shares corresponding to their initial investment. The fund managers pool the money and purchase securities or other assets. What exactly the fund manager can invest in depends on the fund's charter, prospectus and the applicable government regulations. Some funds invest in stocks, others in bonds, and some in very specific things (for instance, tax-exempt bonds issued by the state of Florida in the USA).

Distinguishing features
A closed-end fund differs from an open-end mutual fund in that:
 It is closed to new capital after it begins operating.
 Its shares (typically) trade on stock exchanges rather than being redeemed directly by the fund.
 Its shares can therefore be traded at any time during market opening hours. An open-end fund can usually be traded only at a time of day specified by the managers, and the dealing price will usually not be known in advance.
 It usually trades at a premium or discount to its net asset value. An open-end fund trades at its net asset value (to which sales charges may be added; and adjustments may be made for e.g. the frictional costs of purchasing or selling the underlying investments).
 In the United States, a closed-end company can own unlisted securities.

Another distinguishing feature of a closed-end fund is the common use of leverage (gearing).  In doing so, the fund manager hopes to earn a higher return with this additional invested capital.  This additional capital can be raised by issuing auction rate securities, preferred stock, long-term debt, or reverse-repurchase agreements.

A fund raises its initial equity through the sale of common stock to founding shareholders.  The amount of shareholder equity is known as its net asset value (NAV), and is calculated as total assets of the fund less debt.  As the fund operates, NAV increases with investment gains and decreases with losses.  These gains or losses are amplified when the fund employs leverage.

The amount of leverage a fund uses is expressed as a percent of total fund assets (e.g. if it has a 25% leverage ratio, that means that for each $100 of total assets under management, $75 is equity and $25 is debt).

Leverage affects both fund income, and capital gains and losses.  The additional investments bought with the leverage increases gross income proportionally to the leverage used, but net income is reduced by the interest rate paid to lenders or preferred shareholders.  However, capital gains or losses flow directly to the NAV of the common stock.  This increases the volatility of the NAV of a leveraged fund, compared with its un-leveraged peer.  For example, if an un-leveraged fund had a 10% gain or loss, its 25% leveraged peer would have an about 13.3% gain or loss.  If instead, the fund had a 40% leverage ratio, the gain or loss would be about 16.7%.

In some cases, fund managers charge management fees based on the total managed assets of the fund, which includes leverage.  This further reduces the income benefit of leverage to the common shareholder, while retaining the additional volatility.

Leveraged funds can seem to have higher expense ratios—a common way that investors compare funds—than their non-leveraged peers.  Some investment analysts advocate that expenses attributable to the use of leverage should be considered a reduction of investment income rather than an expense, and publish adjusted ratios.

Long-term debt arrangements and reverse repurchase agreements are two additional ways to raise additional capital for the fund. Funds may use a combination of leveraging tactics or each individually. However, it is more common for the fund to use only one leveraging technique.

Since stock in closed-end funds is traded like other stock, an investor trading them will pay a brokerage commission similar to that paid when trading other stocks (as opposed to commissions on open-ended mutual funds, where the commission will vary based on the share class chosen and the method of purchasing the fund). In other words, closed-end funds typically do not have sales-based share classes with different commission rates and annual fees. The main exception is loan-participation funds.

Initial offering
Like a company going public, a closed-end fund will have an initial public offering of its shares at which it will sell, say, 10 million shares for $10 each. That will raise $100 million for the fund manager to invest. At that point, the fund's 10 million shares will begin to trade on a secondary market, typically the NYSE or the AMEX for American closed-end funds. Any investor who subsequently wishes to buy or sell fund shares will do so on the secondary market. In normal circumstances, closed-end funds do not redeem their own shares. Nor, typically, do they sell more shares after the IPO (although they may issue preferred stock, in essence taking out a loan secured by the portfolio). In general, closed-end funds cannot issue securities for services or property other than cash or securities.

In India an investor can invest in closed-end funds only when it is offered as a New Fund Offering (NFO). Once the NFO period is over, new investors can not enter nor can the existing ones exit. Some close-ended schemes are listed on the stock exchange, even after the NFO, where investors can buy or sell these funds. Sometimes, the mutual fund company repurchases units periodically, where investors are offered an option to sell their units back to the mutual fund house.

Exchange-traded
Closed-end fund shares are traded anytime between market opening and closing hours at whatever price the market will support. It may be possible to deal using advanced types of orders such as limit orders and stop orders. This is in contrast to some open-end funds which are only available for buying and selling at the close of business each day, at the calculated NAV, and for which orders must be placed in advance, before the NAV is known, and by simple buy or sell orders. Some funds require that orders be placed hours or days in advance, in order to simplify their administration, make it easier to match buyers with sellers, and eliminate the possibility of arbitrage (for example if the fund holds investments which are traded in other time zones).

Closed-end funds are traded on exchanges, and in that respect they are like exchange-traded funds (ETFs), but there are important differences between these two kinds of security. The price of a closed-end fund is completely determined by the valuation of the market, and this price often diverges substantially from the NAV of the fund assets. In contrast, the market price of an ETF trades in a narrow range very close to its net asset value, because the structure of ETFs allows major market participants to redeem shares of an ETF for a "basket" of the fund's underlying assets. This feature could in theory lead to potential arbitrage profits if the market price of the ETF were to diverge substantially from its NAV. The market prices of closed-end funds are often 10% to 20% higher or lower than their NAV, while the market price of an ETF is typically within 1% of its NAV. Since the market downturn of late 2008, a number of fixed income ETFs have traded at premiums of roughly 2% to 3% above their NAV.

Discounts and premiums
As they are exchange-traded, the price of CEFs will be different from the NAV - an effect known as the closed-end fund puzzle. In particular, fund shares often trade at what look to be irrational prices because secondary market prices are often very much out of line with underlying portfolio values. A CEF can trade at a premium at some times, and a discount at other times.

The Herzfeld Average is a metric that quantifies the discount or premium at which U.S. closed-end funds traded at a given point in time. It is based on the closing prices of 15 closed-end funds that invest primarily in U.S. equities. For calendar year 2022, the weekly financial newspaper Barron's reported that the Herzfeld Average traded at a discount to net asset value during most of calendar year 2022.

Comparison with open-ended funds
With open-end funds, the value is precisely equal to the NAV. So investing $1000 into the fund means buying shares that lay claim to $1000 worth of underlying assets (apart from sales charges and the fund's investment costs). But buying a closed-end fund trading at a premium might mean buying $900 worth of assets for $1000.

Some advantages of closed-end funds over their open-ended cousins are financial. CEFs do not have to deal with the expense of creating and redeeming shares, they tend to keep less cash in their portfolio, and they need not worry about market fluctuations to maintain their "performance record". So if a stock drops irrationally, the closed-end fund may snap up a bargain, while open-ended funds might sell too early.

Also, if there is a market panic, investors may sell a particular stock or segment of stocks en masse. Faced with a wave of sell orders and needing to raise money for redemptions, the manager of an open-ended fund may be forced to sell stocks he would rather keep, and keep stocks he would rather sell, because of liquidity concerns (selling too much of any one stock causes the price to drop disproportionately). Thus it may become overweight in the shares of lower perceived quality or underperforming companies for which there is little demand. But an investor pulling out of a closed-end fund must sell it on the market to another buyer, so the manager need not sell any of the underlying stock. The CEF's price will likely drop more than the market does (severely punishing those who sell during the panic), but it is more likely to make a recovery when/if the stock(s) rebound.

Because a closed-end fund is listed on the market, it must obey certain rules, such as filing reports with the listing authority and holding annual stockholder meetings.

Examples
Among the biggest, long-running CEFs are:
 Adams Express Company (NYSE:ADX)
 Witan Investment Trust plc (LSE:WTAN)
 Scottish Mortgage Investment Trust (LSE:SMT)
 Tri-Continental Corporation (NYSE:TY)
 Gabelli Equity Trust (NYSE:GAB)

See also
 Collective investment schemes for generic information.
 Investment trust a United Kingdom closed-ended collective investment
 Mutual funds for United States information.
 Listed investment companies for Australia.

References

External links
 SEC – US SEC description of investment company types
 AICA - The Active Investment Company Alliance - Trade Association for Listed/Non-Listed CEFs / BDCs
 CEFA – The Closed-End Fund Association (US)
 CEFA – The Closed-End Fund Association member website (US)
 Investment Company Institute – The US association of investment companies
 AIC – Association of Investment Companies (UK trade body)
 Australian Stock Exchange site – Australian LICs
 What is Closed-End Fund? In Hindi

Investment funds
Exchange-traded products